Matteo Zacconi (died 1565) was a Roman Catholic prelate who served as Bishop of Strongoli (1558–1565).

Biography
On 15 June 1558, Matteo Zacconi was appointed by Pope Paul IV as Bishop of Strongoli.
He served as Bishop of Strongoli until his death in 1565.

See also 
Catholic Church in Italy

References

External links and additional sources
 (for Chronology of Bishops) 
 (for Chronology of Bishops) 

16th-century Italian Roman Catholic bishops
1565 deaths
Bishops appointed by Pope Paul IV